Carphonotus is a genus of true weevils in the beetle family Curculionidae. There are at least two described species in the genus Carphonotus.

Species
These two species belong to the genus Carphonotus:
 Carphonotus ochreipilis Champion & G.C., 1909
 Carphonotus testaceus Casey, 1892

References

Further reading

 
 
 

Cossoninae
Articles created by Qbugbot